Inteqam: The Perfect Game is a 2004 Bollywood film which stars Manoj Bajpai, Isha Koppikar, and Sharat Saxena.

Cast
 Manoj Bajpai as Uday Dhirendra Thakur 
 Isha Koppikar as Avantika Suryavansh/Pinky
 Nethra Raghuraman as Dr. Mehak/Jaya
 Sharat Saxena as Inspector Pandey
 Shahab Khan as DCP Gupta

Songs
"Aayee Aayee Re Holi Aayee" - Sadhana Sargam, Udit Narayan
"Ab Waqt Ki Aahat" - Sowmya Rao
"Armaan Dil Ke Machalne Lage Hain" - Sapna Mukherjee
"Ishq Sarfira" - Kay Kay, Sowmya Rao
"Jhanak Jhanak Jhan Paayal Bole" - Poornima
"Tan Se Jo Chunri" - Richa Sharma
"Theme Of Inteqam" - N/A

References

External links

2000s Hindi-language films
Films scored by Anand–Milind
Films directed by Pankuj Parashar